Jan Raciborski (born 23 July 1961 in Totnes) is a British sprint canoer who competed in the mid to late 1980s. At the 1984 Summer Olympics in Los Angeles, he was eliminated in the semifinals of the K-2 1000 m event. Four years later in Seoul, Raciborski was eliminated in the repechages of the K-4 1000 m event.

References
Sports-Reference.com profile

1961 births
English male canoeists
Canoeists at the 1984 Summer Olympics
Canoeists at the 1988 Summer Olympics
Living people
Olympic canoeists of Great Britain
People from Totnes
British male canoeists